Parliamentary elections were held in the Seychelles in November 1970 for the Legislative Assembly of Seychelles. The result was a victory for the Seychelles Democratic Party, which won 10 of the 15 seats.

Results

References

Seychelles
Parliamentary
Elections in Seychelles
Election and referendum articles with incomplete results